The Mount Nimba giant forest shrew (Crocidura nimbasilvanus) is a species of mammal in the family Soricidae. It is native to West Africa, where it is found in Ivory Coast, Guinea, Liberia, and Sierra Leone.

It was formerly synonymized with the goliath shrew (C. goliath), but phylogenetic studies have found it to be more closely related to the Nimba shrew (C. nimbae). It is found in the lowland forests of the Upper Guinean forests, with isolated populations in Mount Nimba, the Ziama Massif, the Simandou Range, and Gola Rainforest National Park. Although it is thought to be an uncommon species, it is not considered to be threatened due to a wide range and occurring in several protected areas, although at some localities it may be at risk from habitat destruction due to mining concessions.

References 

Crocidura
Mammals of West Africa
Mammals described in 2003